Gädheim is a municipality in the district of Haßberge in Bavaria in Germany. It lies in the Main river valley.

References

Haßberge (district)